Thomas Marrison (1881–1926) was an English footballer who played in the Football League for Bristol City, Nottingham Forest, Oldham Athletic and The Wednesday.

References

1881 births
1926 deaths
English footballers
Association football forwards
English Football League players
Rotherham Town F.C. (1899) players
Nottingham Forest F.C. players
Oldham Athletic A.F.C. players
Bristol City F.C. players